The following is a list of notable people who were born, grew up, and spent a portion of life and or career in Hammond, Indiana.

 Robert K. Abbett - artist, illustrator
 R.J.Q. Adams - historian
 Norman C. Anderson - Speaker of the Wisconsin State Assembly
 Michael Badnarik - Libertarian Party 2004 presidential candidate
 Gerald R. Beaman - U.S. Navy admiral
 Dodie Bellamy - author
 Stephan Bonnar - UFC fighter
 Kathleen Burke - actress
 Darrel Chaney - baseball player 
 Jack Chevigny - football player, coach, lawyer, and United States Marine Corps officer
 Denny Clanton - soccer player 
 Bartlett Cormack - playwright and screenwriter
 Irv Cross, NFL player and commentator 
 Alberta Darling - Wisconsin politician
 Jon Deak - contrabassist
 Jon DeGuilio - judge
 John H. Eastwood - US Army Air Corps chaplain, World War II
 Hal Faverty - NFL player 
 Maxx Frank - gospel singer
 Dory Funk - professional wrestler fighting under both his real name and as "The Outlaw"
 Dory Funk Jr.
 Terry Funk - professional wrestler and actor
 Neil Goodman - sculptor and educator
 George Groves - professional football player 
 Wally Hess - football player
Mitchell F. Jayne, musician and author
 Khari Jones - player in Canadian Football League, television commentator 
 Jeremy Jordan - actor, singer
 Bruce Konopka - baseball player
 Ken Kremer - football player
 Jim Lewis - Disney and Wal-Mart executive
 Bob Livingstone - football player
 Thomas McDermott, Jr. - mayor
 Monica Maxwell - basketball player, played in Women's National Basketball Association
 Roy McPipe - basketball player, drafted by NBA in '73 and '74, played with ABA's Utah Stars in 1975
 Carl Frederick Mengeling - Bishop of Lansing 1996-2008
 Joseph F. Meyer - horticulturist, herbalist, founder of the Indiana Botanic Gardens
 Phil Montgomery - Wisconsin politician
 Frank J. Mrvan - local politician and 2020 congressional candidate
 Billy Muffett - baseball player
 Art Murakowski - football player
 Samuel Panayotovich - Illinois politician
 Merle Pertile - model, Playboy Playmate, January 1962
 Charles B. Pierce - filmmaker
 Fritz Pollard - first black NFL head coach for now-defunct Hammond Pros, member of Pro Football Hall of Fame
 Alvah Curtis Roebuck - founded Sears, Roebuck and Company
 Mike D. Rogers - Alabama politician
 Aaron Rosand - violin soloist 
 Jordan Schafer - baseball player 
 Ryan Schau - football player
 Mike Sember - baseball player
 Scott Sheldon - baseball player 
 Jean Shepherd - born in Chicago, raised in Hammond, TV and radio personality, best known as writer and narrator of film A Christmas Story (1983)
 Bobby Skafish - Chicago radio personality
 Chips Sobek - basketball player, coach and official
 Glenn Michael Souther - US Navy defector to Soviet Union
 Miguel Torres - UFC fighter
 Jimmy Valiant - professional wrestler
 Lois V Vierk - music composer of post-minimalist and totalist schools
 David Wilkerson - minister, evangelist and writer
 Joe Winkler - football player
 Doc Young - Hammond physician, one of the founders of the National Football League
 Harry Yourell - Illinois state representative and businessman
 DJ Rashad - notable footwork DJ/producer
 Bob Chapek - Former CEO of The Walt Disney Company

References

Hammond
Hammond, Indiana